The 1984 Australian Super Series was an Australian motor racing competition for Group E Series Production Cars. With prizemoney totaling $200,000, the series was claimed, at the time, to be "the richest race series staged in Australia".

The series was won by Peter Fitzgerald driving a Mitsubishi Starion.

Race schedule
The series was contested over six rounds with two heats and a final at each round.

Series standings

References

Super Series